Stenoptilodes antirrhina, the snapdragon plume moth, is a moth of the family Pterophoridae. It is known from California in the United States, but also from greenhouses in the south-eastern U.S. that have received cuttings of snapdragon from California.

The wingspan is 15–25 mm.

The larvae feed on Antirrhinum species (including Antirrhinum majus), as well as Pelargonium x hortorum. Young larvae mine the leaves and later burrow into the stem, petioles, flowers or seed pods. The development to a full-grown larva takes three to five weeks. The species overwinters as an adult.

References

External links
Image showing damage

antirrhina
Moths described in 1940
Endemic fauna of the United States
Insects of North America